CMP-acetylneuraminate-lactosylceramide-sialyltransferase may refer to:
 Lactosylceramide alpha-2,6-N-sialyltransferase, an enzyme
 Lactosylceramide alpha-2,3-sialyltransferase, an enzyme